Masonville is an unincorporated community and census-designated place (CDP) in Daviess County, Kentucky, United States. The population was 1,014 at the 2010 census. It is included in the Owensboro Metropolitan Statistical Area.

Geography
Masonville is located in south-central Daviess County at  (37.683612, -87.036563). U.S. Route 231 passes through the center of the CDP. The William H. Natcher Parkway forms the eastern border of the CDP, but there is no exit for the community.

Demographics

As of the census of 2000, there were 1,075 people, 381 households, and 310 families residing in the CDP. The racial makeup of the CDP was 99.16% White, 0.09% African American, and 0.74% from two or more races. Hispanic or Latino of any race were 0.19% of the population.

There were 381 households, out of which 41.5% had children under the age of 18 living with them, 67.7% were married couples living together, 9.7% had a female householder with no husband present, and 18.6% were non-families. 17.1% of all households were made up of individuals, and 5.5% had someone living alone who was 65 years of age or older. The average household size was 2.82 and the average family size was 3.15.

In the CDP, the population was spread out, with 30.0% under the age of 18, 7.3% from 18 to 24, 30.8% from 25 to 44, 23.0% from 45 to 64, and 9.0% who were 65 years of age or older. The median age was 34 years. For every 100 females, there were 102.8 males. For every 100 females age 18 and over, there were 99.7 males.

The median income for a household in the CDP was $37,171, and the median income for a family was $45,795. Males had a median income of $35,089 versus $19,250 for females. The per capita income for the CDP was $20,469. About 10.9% of families and 10.3% of the population were below the poverty line, including 21.2% of those under age 18 and 10.5% of those age 65 or over.

References

Census-designated places in Daviess County, Kentucky
Census-designated places in Kentucky
Owensboro metropolitan area